Jump on It is the fourth studio album by American hard rock band Montrose.

It is the second Montrose album to feature singer Bob James and keyboardist Jim Alcivar, and features bassist Randy Jo Hobbs on three songs. The remainder of the bass parts were supplied by Jim Alcivar via the keyboard and there was no bassist on the Jump on It tour. Jack Douglas produced the album.

Jump on It was the band's third highest-charting release, reaching No. 118 on the Billboard 200 in October 1976.

Track listing
Side one
 "Let's Go" (Bob James, Ronnie Montrose, Jim Alcivar, Denny Carmassi) – 4:15
 "What Are You Waitin' For?" (Dan Hartman) – 3:48
 "Tuft-Sedge" (Montrose) – 2:50
 "Music Man" (Montrose) – 4:16

Side two
 "Jump on It" (James, Montrose, Alcivar, Carmassi) – 3:37
 "Rich Man" (Hartman) – 4:24
 "Crazy for You" (Montrose, Ilene "Chunky" Rappaport) – 3:26
 "Merry-Go-Round" (Montrose) – 5:38

Personnel
Montrose
 Bob James – vocals
 Ronnie Montrose – guitars
 Jim Alcivar – keyboards
 Denny Carmassi – drums

Additional musicians
 Randy Jo Hobbs – bass on "Let's Go", "Jump On It" and "Rich Man"
 Bob Alcivar – string arrangements

Production
 Jack Douglas – producer
 Jay Messina – engineer
 Rod O'Brien – additional recording & engineering
 Hipgnosis – cover design and photography

References

Other sources
 Montrose; Jump On It liner notes; Warner Brothers Records 1976
 Ronnie Montrose; The Very Best of Montrose liner notes; Rhino Records 2000

1976 albums
Montrose (band) albums
Warner Records albums
Albums produced by Jack Douglas (record producer)
Albums with cover art by Hipgnosis